The Kirti Chakra is an Indian military decoration awarded for valour, courageous action or self-sacrifice away from the field of battle. It may be awarded to civilians as well as military personnel, including posthumous awards. It is the peacetime equivalent of the Maha Vir Chakra. It is second in order of precedence of peacetime gallantry awards; it comes after Ashoka Chakra and before Shaurya Chakra. Before 1967, the award was known as the Ashoka Chakra, Class II.

2020–2029

2010–2019

2000–2009

1990–1999

1980–1989

1970–1979

1960–1969

1952–1959

References 

Civil awards and decorations of India
Military awards and decorations of India
Kirti Chakra